The men's singles snooker competition at the 2013 World Games took place from 26 to 30 July at the Unidad Deportiva Alberto Galindo in Cali, Colombia.

Bracket

References

Snooker - men's singles
World Games
Snooker at the World Games